Radio 5 may refer to:

 BBC Radio 5 Live, a British radio station
 BBC Radio 5 Sports Extra, a British radio station
 BBC Radio 5 (former), a former British radio station
 NPO Radio 5, a Dutch radio station
 Radio 5 (Spanish radio station), an all news radio station operated by Radio Nacional de España
 WDR 5, a German public radio station
 5FM, a South African radio station, formerly known as Radio 5
 Radio 5, a 1982 album by British band Alkatrazz